Frédéric Boeni (born 15 November 1913, date of death unknown) was a Swiss diver. He competed in the men's 3 metre springboard event at the 1936 Summer Olympics.

References

1913 births
Year of death missing
Swiss male divers
Olympic divers of Switzerland
Divers at the 1936 Summer Olympics
Place of birth missing